Sabirzhan Ruziyev (born 15 June 1953) is a Soviet fencer. He won a silver medal in the team foil event at the 1980 Summer Olympics.

References

External links
 

1953 births
Living people
Uzbekistani male foil fencers
Soviet male foil fencers
Olympic fencers of the Soviet Union
Fencers at the 1976 Summer Olympics
Fencers at the 1980 Summer Olympics
Olympic silver medalists for the Soviet Union
Olympic medalists in fencing
People from Chüy Region
Medalists at the 1980 Summer Olympics
Universiade medalists in fencing
Universiade gold medalists for the Soviet Union
Medalists at the 1977 Summer Universiade